Andrew Gaff (born 16 June 1992) is a professional Australian rules footballer playing for the West Coast Eagles in the Australian Football League (AFL). He plays predominantly as a midfielder.

Gaff was recruited from the Oakleigh Chargers with the fourth pick in the 2010 National Draft. He made his debut in round one of the 2011 season, and later in the year was nominated for the AFL Rising Star Award. Gaff has been a regular in the West Coast line-up since his debut, and in 2015 played in the club's grand final loss to Hawthorn. He won the John Worsfold Medal as West Coast's best and fairest player that year, and was also named in the 2015 All-Australian team. Gaff placed equal fourth in the 2016 Brownlow Medal. He was named in the 2018 All-Australian team.

Early life
Gaff attended Kew East Primary School until 2004 and Carey Baptist Grammar School in his high school years. He starred in the Carey First XVIII football team as a hard-running midfielder who proved to be a prolific goalkicker.

Originally from the Kew Comets Junior Football Club in the Yarra Junior Football League, Gaff played in the TAC Cup with the Oakleigh Chargers. before being selected with the fourth pick overall in the 2010 National Draft by the West Coast Eagles. Recognised as one of the best prospects in his draft year, Gaff was renowned for his endurance, work ethic, kicking and ability to accumulate possessions.

AFL career
Gaff played his first game for the Eagles in the pool round of the 2011 NAB Cup, playing against  and gathering six possessions, before being rested in the second game against .

He became the third player in the Eagles' history to wear the No. 3 jumper for the Eagles after Chris Mainwaring and Chris Judd. The jumper was retired for three years following Mainwaring's death in October 2007 and Judd's departure from the club prior to the 2008 season.

Gaff made his AFL debut in the opening round match against , replacing Chris Masten as the Eagles' first substitute player.

Gaff was rewarded for his form by being nominated for the 2011 AFL Rising Star award in round 19, 2011.

Gaff had an extremely consistent season in 2012, gathering a total of 591 disposals and booting 9 goals for the season.

His 2013 season wasn't as consistent as the season previous, but he still played 22 games and gathered 437 disposals.

In 2014, Gaff had further improved season, gathering 534 disposals and kicking 10 goals for the year, he also played 22 games.

2015 saw Andrew become a truly elite player in the competition, he amassed 738 disposals and kicked 11 goals for the season. Including a season highlight of 36 disposals and 3 goals against Adelaide in Round 15. As of the end of round 18, 2015, Gaff was having a career best year. He is ranked equal fifth in the AFL Coaches Association voting, and averages 29.9 touches a game, including a remarkable run of five straight games where he collected more than 30 disposals.

At the conclusion of the 2015 season, he was awarded the John Worsfold Medal as the club's best-and-fairest player. His outstanding form was recognised league-wide as he was named on the wing in the 2015 All-Australian team.

Gaff had another consistent year in 2016, despite being knocked unconscious in round 9 by Port Adelaide's Tom Jonas, causing him to miss a week and dip in form, albeit slightly. He rebounded strongly in the last month of the year as the Eagles found some stunning form. He had a career best 38 disposals in a clinical win over Hawthorn at Subiaco in round 22, and then set a new career-best tally with 41 disposals the next week against Adelaide at Adelaide Oval, as the Eagles entered the finals as the form team of the competition. He was rewarded with a place in the 40 person All-Australian squad, but was left out of the final 22-man team.

In 2018, Gaff was referred to the AFL Tribunal after an off-the-ball strike on Fremantle player Andrew Brayshaw which left him with a broken jaw and three dislodged teeth. He was subsequently suspended for eight AFL matches leading to him missing out on playing in West Coast's premiership. In October, Gaff, a restricted free agent, announced he would turn down a contract with North Melbourne, reportedly for seven years and worth around $8 million, to stay at West Coast.

Statistics
 Statistics are correct to the end of Round 22 2022

|- style="background:#eaeaea;"
! scope="row" | 
|  || 3 || 17 || 7 || 7 || 172 || 130 || 302 || 75 || 19 || 0.4 || 0.4 || 10.1 || 7.6 || 17.8 || 4.4 || 1.1 || 4
|-
! scope="row" | 
|  || 3 || 24 || 9 || 13 || 374 || 217 || 591 || 114 || 34 || 0.4 || 0.5 || 15.6 || 9.0 || 24.6 || 4.8 || 1.4 || 4
|-
|- style="background:#eaeaea;"
! scope="row" | 
|  || 3 || 22 || 5 || 9 || 266 || 171 || 437 || 76 || 40 || 0.2 || 0.4 || 12.1 || 7.8 || 19.9 || 3.5 || 1.8 || 2
|-
! scope="row" | 
|  || 3 || 22 || 10 || 2 || 344 || 190 || 534 || 120 || 54 || 0.4 || 0.1 || 15.6 || 8.6 || 24.3 || 5.5 || 2.4 || 6
|- style="background:#eaeaea;"
! scope="row" | 
|  || 3 || 25 || 11 || 8 || 415 || 323 || 738 || 111 || 62 || 0.4 || 0.3 || 16.6 || 12.9 || 29.5 || 4.4 || 2.5 || 17
|-
! scope="row" | 
|  || 3 || 22 || 7 || 6 || 372 || 285 || 657 || 81 || 27 || 0.3 || 0.3 || 16.9 || 13.0 || 29.9 || 3.7 || 1.2 || 21
|- style="background:#eaeaea;"
! scope="row" | 
|  || 3 || 24 || 6 || 6 || 414 || 299 || 713 || 127 || 49 || 0.2 || 0.2 || 17.2 || 12.5 || 29.7 || 5.3 || 2.0 || 9
|-
! scope="row" | 
|  || 3 || 19 || 12 || 4 || 339 || 244 || 583 || 100 || 56 || 0.6 || 0.2 || 17.8 || 12.8 || 30.7 || 5.3 || 3.0 || 16
|- style="background:#eaeaea;"
! scope="row" | 
|  || 3 || 22 || 3 || 1 || 437 || 265 || 702 || 141 || 52 || 0.1 || 0.0 || 19.9 || 12.0 || 31.9 || 6.4 || 2.4 || 13
|- 
! scope="row" style="text-align:center" | 2020
|  
|| 3 || 18 || 5 || 4 || 251 || 186 || 437 || 81 || 42 || 0.3 || 0.2 || 13.9 || 10.3 || 24.3 || 4.5 || 2.3 || 8
|- style="background-color: #EAEAEA"
! scope="row" | 
|  || 3 || 21 || 3 || 1 || 343 || 234 || 577 || 140 || 35 || 0.1 || 0.0 || 16.3 || 11.1 || 27.5 || 6.7 || 1.7 || 9
|- 
! scope="row" style="text-align:center" | 2022
|  
|| 3 || 16 || 2 || 3 || 191 || 192 || 383 || 72 || 38 || 0.1 || 0.1 || 11.9 || 12.0 || 23.9 || 4.5 || 2.3 || 1
|- style="background:#eaeaea;"
|- class="sortbottom"
! colspan=3| Career
! 252
! 80
! 64
! 3918
! 2736
! 6654
! 1238
! 508
! 0.3
! 0.2
! 15.5
! 10.8
! 26.4
! 4.9
! 2.0
! 110
|}

Notes

References

External links

1992 births
Living people
West Coast Eagles players
Oakleigh Chargers players
South Fremantle Football Club players
All-Australians (AFL)
People educated at Carey Baptist Grammar School
Australian rules footballers from Melbourne
John Worsfold Medal winners
Australia international rules football team players